Late August, Early September is a 1998 French drama film directed by Olivier Assayas and starring Mathieu Amalric.

Plot
Several lovers and friends come to make decisions on how to live their lives, finding a job more in harmony with one's ideals, committing to a lover, giving up a lover that no longer loves you: grown-ups growing up.

Cast
 Mathieu Amalric as Gabriel
 Virginie Ledoyen as Anne
 François Cluzet as Adrien
 Jeanne Balibar as Jenny
 Alex Descas as Jérémie
 Arsinée Khanjian as Lucie
 Mia Hansen-Løve as Véra
 Nathalie Richard as Maryelle
 Éric Elmosnino as Thomas
 Olivier Cruveiller as Axel
 Jean-Baptiste Malartre as Editeur
 André Marcon as Hattou
 Elisabeth Mazev as Visiteuse de l'appartement
 Olivier Py as Visiteur de l'appartement
 Jean-Baptiste Montagut as Joseph Costa

References

External links

Late August, Early September at Zeitgeist Films

1998 films
1998 drama films
1990s French-language films
French drama films
Films directed by Olivier Assayas
Films with screenplays by Olivier Assayas
1990s French films